Gregory Neil Stivers (born June 20, 1960) is the Chief United States district judge of the United States District Court for the Western District of Kentucky.

Biography

Stivers was born on June 20, 1960, in Hazard, Kentucky. He received a Bachelor of Arts degree in 1982 from Eastern Kentucky University. He received a Juris Doctor in 1985 from the University of Kentucky College of Law. He spent his entire legal career at the Bowling Green, Kentucky, law firm of Kerrick, Stivers, Coyle, PLC, formerly known as Campbell, Kerrick and Grise, joining as an associate in 1985 and becoming partner in 1990, leaving in 2014 upon receiving his judicial commission. His legal practice focused on employment and general civil litigation in Federal and State courts. He also served as the designated outside legal counsel for Western Kentucky University.

Federal judicial service

On June 19, 2014, President Barack Obama nominated Stivers to serve as a United States District Judge of the United States District Court for the Western District of Kentucky, to the seat vacated by Judge Thomas B. Russell, who assumed senior status on November 15, 2011. On July 29, 2014 a hearing before the United States Senate Committee on the Judiciary was held on his nomination. On September 18, 2014 his nomination was reported out of committee by a voice vote. On December 3, 2014 Senate Majority Leader Harry Reid filed for cloture on his nomination. On December 4, 2014, the Senate voted to invoke cloture on his nomination by a 69–24 vote. Later that same day, the Senate confirmed Stivers by a voice vote. He received his federal judicial commission on December 5, 2014.

Personal 

Stivers is a neighbor of Senator Rand Paul.  At the time of Stivers' nomination, Paul's Senate office in Bowling Green was in the same building that housed Stivers' law firm.

References

External links

1960 births
Living people
Eastern Kentucky University alumni
Judges of the United States District Court for the Western District of Kentucky
Kentucky lawyers
People from Hazard, Kentucky
United States district court judges appointed by Barack Obama
21st-century American judges
University of Kentucky College of Law alumni